Stefan Elmgren (born 17 May 1974) is the former guitarist of the Swedish power metal band HammerFall from 1997 to 2008.

History
Before becoming a member of HammerFall, he was the guitarist in the band Highlander. Elmgren has also worked with his solo project Full Strike and released one album called We Will Rise which was released in 2002. Stefan also plays the guitar in Joacim Cans' solo project Cans.

He quit the band in 2008 to put more energy into his career as a pilot. He currently plays with Full Force.

In 2014, it was announced that Elmgren would temporarily return to HammerFall, playing bass guitar while regular bass player Fredrik Larsson was on paternity leave.

Discography

With HammerFall
1998 – Legacy of Kings
1999 – The First Crusade (DVD)
2000 – Renegade
2002 – Crimson Thunder
2002 – The Templar Renegade Crusades (DVD)
2002 – Hearts on Fire (DVD)
2003 – One Crimson Night (live album, DVD)
2005 – Chapter V: Unbent, Unbowed, Unbroken
2006 – Threshold
2007 – Steel Meets Steel - Ten Years of Glory (Best Of)
2008 – Masterpieces (cover album)
2008 – Rebels with a Cause – Unruly, Unrestrained, Uninhibited (DVD)

With Full Strike
2002 – We Will Rise

With CANS
2004 – Beyond the Gates

With Fullforce
2011 – One
2012 – Next Level

References

1974 births
Living people
Lead guitarists
Swedish guitarists
Male guitarists
Swedish heavy metal musicians
21st-century guitarists
HammerFall members
Swedish male musicians